Artcell is a Bangladeshi progressive metal band formed in October 1999 by vocalist and riff guitarist George Lincoln D'Costa, lead guitarist Ershad Zaman, bassist Saef Al Nazi Cézanne and drummer Kazi Sazzadul Asheqeen Shaju.

The first song the band composed was ‘অন্য সময় (Other Time)’. The song set the standard for all the songs yet to come along the way. The first song released by Artcell was ‘Odekha Shorgo’ which was recorded for the great Azam Khan for a mixed album he was planning on. But later it was released on a mixed album called Charpotro'. The song ‘Onnoshomoy’ was written by Rumman Ahmed and ‘Odekha Shorgo’ by Rupok. Both Rumman and Rupok were very close friends of the band members; and together they wrote most of the songs for Artcell. During that time songwriter Rupok died from cerebral malaria on 2002.Rupok left when the band was working on their first solo album ‘অন্য সময় (Other Time)’, which was later released in CD's on May 5, 2002 and was dedicated in remembering of Rupok . And after four years of releasing ‘Onno Shomoy’; Artcell came up with their second album 'Oniket Prantor' on 2006 which led them widespread recognition. These are the only two albums the band has released since their establishment. Due to some personal reasons Shaju and Cezanne left Bangladesh 2011 and are settling at Sydney. But despite their absence, Lincoln and Ershad is carrying on with Artcell with guest members. They pronounced Kazi Faisal Ahmed as their permanent lead guitarist on 11 November 2018. On July 26, 2018 after 12 years since their last album the band announced that they were going to release their third album very soon with the original lineup.

According to The Daily Star, Artcell is one of the leading bands of the country. Their song Oniket Prantor is one of the most iconic band songs in the country.

History
Formation and early days (1999–2000)
Prior to forming the band, the four founding members were school friends from Dhaka, and used to get together to play Metallica songs. Eventually, Ershad came up with compositions of his own and the group began to play them at shows. The positive response they received led to the formation of a band. What started off as an underground band is now one of the most recognised mainstream bands in the Bengali metal music scene.

The name "Artcell" was decided upon because it was softer sounding than a typical heavy metal name. In Cézanne and Shaju's words:

 Onno Shomoy (অন্য সময়) (2000–2002) 

Artcell released their first studio album Onno Shomoy in 2002 by G-Series. It was both critically and commercially successful. The band lost its main songwriter Rupok to cerebral malaria while working on this album. The album was dedicated to him. One of the songs was titled "রুপক একটি গান (Rupok A Song)" in his memory.

 Oniket Prantor (অনিকেত প্রান্তর) (2002–2006) 

After the success of Onno Shomoy, Artcell spent four years carrying out experiments with their music without releasing an album. They did, however, release singles scattered in various albums by other bands or compilation albums. Their second studio album "Aniket Prantor (No man's land)" was released in April 2006. The album was one of the top sellers of the year.

"Aniket Prantor (No man's land)", the album's namesake, is Artcell's longest song to date, at 16 minutes and 21 seconds.

In May the band performed their second solo concert at Dhaka's Bashundhara Convention Centre.

2007–2019

Artcell celebrated its 10th anniversary tour on 23 October 2009 with a live concert entitled "10 Years of Artcell Insanity" at the Winter Garden, Dhaka Sheraton Hotel.   

Artcell continue to regularly perform live shows and have also made many tours of Dhaka, Chittagong, Khulna, Rajshahi and Sylhet, with some tours in India and Sydney, Australia.

In 2009 the band took part in the "International Coastal Cleanup 2009", a day-long beach clean-up movement, at the Cox's Bazar sea beach.

In early 2010, the band travelled to Australia and performed at Belmore Sports Ground in Sydney on 3 January. The band was due to be one of the country's leading bands to perform at a concert against violence against women in the Banani Army Stadium, Dhaka, in December 2010.

On 9 January 2012, Artcell announced the release of their third album and confirmed that it would be released by the end of the year. They posted on their Facebook page: "This is to inform all Artcell fans and friends who have been waiting for our 3rd album, wait just for a few more months and Hopefully you won't be disappointed. In addition, Artcell is also getting ready with some special releases...Music, videos and communication contents. So, look forward to a year full of activities. Thank you all again for your love and support. You guys are our true strength. Thank you".

Artcell worked on their third album in 2013.

They played in "Rocknation Overload" on 19 April 2014 after a break of around two years.

Cézanne and Shaju, two of the founding members, have not been active with the band for a long time. They only work with the band when they come to Bangladesh. The official Artcell website says that both of them have settled in Sydney, Australia, for family reasons. Ershad And Lincoln are presently running the band themselves with guest members.

In 2016, Artcell released their new music video "Obimrishshota" from their third album Otriteeyo with the original band lineup. After almost 10 years their new song had been released, written by their new lyricist Ishtiak. Both Cézanne and Shaju remain in Sydney, but they participated in the album work. Cézanne recently said in an interview that he is planning to be back in the country soon.

In the 17 years since its inception, the band has released two albums. Their third album was scheduled to be released in December 2016. Initially scheduled for a 2012 release, it is widely speculated that the delay is due to Cézanne and Shaju's inactivity, and to Ershad and Lincoln's busy schedule. But later band members among themselves created controversy fighting each other on social media. There was three versus one fight, as Ershad was all alone. Lincoln carried out the band with his favorite students and knowns.

In 2019, Kazi Faisal Ahmed (founder and lead guitarist of Metal Maze) joined Artcell as their permanent lead guitarist and performed in the highly esteemed open-air concert "Joy Bangla" Concert. Artcell released a heavy-sounding track with Kazi Faisal Ahmed playing the solo within a very short time. Later that year, Artcell played on their 20th anniversary open-air gig in the Expo Zone of International Convention City Bashundhara (ICCB).
 Members 

 Present members 
 George Lincoln D'Costa – vocals, guitars 
 Kazi Faisal Ahmed – lead guitar 
 Saef Al Nazi Cézanne – bass 
Iqbal Asif Jewel - guitar 
 Kazi Shazzadul Asheqeen Shaju – drums 

 Badhan Barman – Manager 

Past members
 Ershad Zaman - lead guitar 

 Touring members 
 Sheikh Reaz – Drums 
 Niaz Kamran Abir - Drums 
 Titas Baha – Bass guitars 

Discography

Studio albums
 Onno Shomoy (2002)
 Oniket Prantor (2006)  
 Otritio (2023)

Track listing
Artcell have released a total of 45 tracks till March 2023. Among them 26 are from their 3 studio album, 13 from band mixed albums and 6 Singles. The first released song was Odekha Shorgo (অদেখা স্বর্গ) in 2001 from the band mixed album Chharpotro (ছারপত্র).  The last released song was Harano Chetona (হারানো চেতনা)'' in 2022, it was a single release. Artcell released their long awaited 3rd album "Otritio" on 23 February, 2023 exclusively on GAAN.app. Global release of this album was on 09 march, 2023.
Studio albums
Artcell have released 26 songs under their own studio albums.
 Onno Shomoy   
 অন্যসময় (Onno Shomoy)
 ভুল জন্ম (Bhul Jonmo)
 পথ চলা (Poth Chola)
 রুপক (একটি গান) (Rupok: Ekti Gaan)
 মুখোশ (Mukhosh)
 রাহুর গ্রাস (Rahur Grash)
 ইতিহাস (Itihash)
 কৃত্রিম মানুষ (Kritrim Manush)
 অবশ অনুভূতির দেয়াল (Obosh Onubhutir Deyal
 অলস সময়ের পাড়ে (Olosh Shomoyer Pare)

 Oniket Prantor 
 লীন (Leen)
 স্মৃতি স্মারক (Smriti Sharok)
 ধূসর সময় (Dhushor Shomoy)
 পাথর বাগান (Pathor Bagan)
 ছায়ার নিনাদ (Chayar Ninad) - Instrumental
 ঘুনে খাওয়া রোদ (Ghune Khawa Rodh)
 শহীদ স্মরণী (Shahid Shoroni)
 তোমাকে (Tomake)
 গন্তব্যহীন (Gontobbohin)
 অনিকেত প্রান্তর (Oniket Prantor)

 Otritio  
 প্রতীতি (Protiti) - Instrumental
 বাক্স বন্দী (Baksho Bondi)
 বিপ্রতীপ  (Biprotip)
 স্মৃতির আয়না (Smritir Ayna)
 অসমাপ্ত সান্ত্বনা (Oshomapto Shantona)
 অতৃতীয় (Otritio)

Band Mixed Album
Artcell have released 13 songs from 12 different band mixed album.

 Chharpotro  
 অদেখা স্বর্গ (Odhekha Shorgo)

 Anushilon (2002) 
 অপ্সরী (Opshori)
 দুঃখ বিলাশ (Dukkho Bilash)

 Agontuk (2003) 
 অস্তিত্বের দিকে পদধ্বনির সম্মোহন (Ostitter Dike Pododdhonir Shommohon)

 Projonmo (2003) 
 স্বপ্নের কোরাস (Shopner Chorus)

 Agontuk-2 (2004) 
 চিলে কোঠার সেপাই (Chile Kothar Shepai)

 Lokayoto (2004) 
 ছেঁড়া আকাশ (Chera Akash)

 Agontuk-3 (2005) 
 বাংলাদেশ...স্মৃতি ও আমরা (Bangladesh...Shriti O Amra)

 Underground (2006) 
 উৎসবের উৎসাহে (Utshober Utshahe)

 Live Now (2007) 
 এই বিদায়ে (Ei Bidaye)

 Rock 303 (2009) 
 কান্ডারী হুশিয়ার (Kandari Hushiar)

 Din Bodol (2014) 
 আশীর্বাদ (Ashirbad) [with Black and Cryptic Fate]

 Riotous 14 (2014) 
 কারার ঐ লৌহ কপাট (Karar Oi Louho Kopat)

Singles
Artcell have released 6 singles.

 হুংকারের অপেক্ষায় (Hunkarer Opekkhay) (2011)
 স্পর্শের অনুভূতি (Sporsher Onuvuti) (2016)
 অবিমৃষ্যতা (Obimrishshota)  (2016)
 সংশয় (Shongshoy) (2019) 
 অভয় (Obhoy) (2019) 
 হারানো চেতনা (Harano Chetona) (2022)

 Unreleased/Demo 

 Jani Bhul Korechi Ami
 Jibon Jokhon
 Provu

 Live Album 

 The Platform Live: Artcell (Season 1, Vol.1) (2022)'''

 Ei Bidaye
 Chile Kothar Shepai
 Dhushor Shomoy
 Uthshober Uthshahe
 Poth Chola
 Dukkho Bilash
 Onno Shomoy

Videography
Artcell has done music videos of some of their greatest hit song. They have 8 music videos.
 "অলস সময়ের পাড়ে (Lazy Time Shifts)"
 "বাংলাদেশ... স্মৃতি ও আমরা (Bangladesh... Memories and Us)" 
 "লীন (Leen)"
 "পাথর  বাগান (Stone Garden)"
 "অন্য সময় (Other Times)"
 "ধুসর সময় (Gray Times)"
 "অবিমৃষ্যতা (Ingenuity)"
 "অদেখা স্বর্গ (Unseen Heaven)"

References

External links

 
 

Bengali music
Bangladeshi rock music groups
Musical groups established in 1999
Bangladeshi progressive rock groups
1999 establishments in Bangladesh